Gapforce is a UK-based gap year and student volunteering provider. Founded in 1989, Gapforce is a leading provider of structured adventure travel programs, volunteer projects, conservation placements and outdoor training courses.

Gapforce is based in the United Kingdom and has in-country staff all around the world.

Overview

Gapforce offers a large variety of volunteer, adventure travel and gap year programs both in the UK and overseas that combine conservation and wildlife volunteering, adventure travel, and outdoor training courses.

Staff training

All Gapforce leaders have completed the renowned Expedition Leader Training course. The 16-week ELT course begins in the mountains of Wales before heading into the jungles of Costa Rica and Panama where participants receive full training and internationally recognised certifications, hands-on skills and comprehensive training, enabling them to safely plan and lead expeditions around the world.

References

External links 
 

Companies established in 1989
Companies of the United Kingdom